Jemal Karchkhadze (1936–1998) was a Georgian writer. He is the author of six novels, some short stories and essays. His works are conceptual and gained popularity after his death. His novel Antonio and David (1987) was published in Swedish in 2013, in Arabic in 2014 and in English in 2015.

Jemal Karchkhadze was born in 1936 in the village of Ukhuti in Vani in western Georgia. He graduated in 1960 with a degree in Georgian language and literature at Tbilisi State University. His short story Igi was published in 1977. This was followed by his most important novels The Caravan (1984), Antonio and David (1987) and Zebulon (1988). He died in 1998 in Tbilisi and is buried at the Didube Pantheon.

Jemal Karchkhadze was granted three literary awards: 1999 –  Georgian State Award for Dimension and for his Contribution to the National Literature; 2007 – Award “Gala” for Complete Short Stories; 2007 – Award Librarian’s Choice for a novel Antonio and David.

Film and theater adaptations
The play Devidze Family was shown in major theaters across Georgia, including Marjanishvili Theater in 1964-1965. This was followed by a TV-play “Operation Aunt Taso” based on the eponymous short story transmitted in the late 1970s. A performance based on "Igi" is regularly shown at the Movement Theater in Tbilisi, while a full-length animation is in the works by 20 Steps Production and has already collected accolades and prizes, such as the Annecy International Animation Festival MIFA Pitch in 2022 and Best Feature Animation Award at CEE Animation Forum 2020. The animated movie Igi is set to be released in 2025 and is a Georgian-Czech co-production.

Bibliography
The Prince and The Dragon, Karckhadze Publishing, 2014 
Antonio and David, 1987, Karchkhadze Publishing 2009, 2014
"Igi", 1977, Diogene Publishing, 2001
Complete Short Stories, Karchkhadze Publishing 2012 
The Dimension, 2001, Karchkhadze Publishing, 2008, 2012
The Lodger, 1979, Karchkhadze Publishing, 2008, 2011
The Caravan, 1984, Karchkhadze Publishing 2012
Zebulon, 1988, Karchkhadze Publishing, 2005, 2012 
The Remorse of Jupiter, 1994, Karchkhadze Publishing 2009 
Flower of Magnolia or Grandmother Ann’s Death, Diogene Publishing, 1999

Literary Prizes and Awards
Librarian’s Choice Award 2007 for a novel "Antonio and David"
Literary prize GALA 2007 in category the best prose for Complete Short Stories
Georgian State Award 1999 for his Contribution to the National Literature and the novel The Dimension

References

“Antonio och David av Jemal Karchkhadze
Biography of Jemal Karchkhadze

1936 births
1998 deaths
Writers from Georgia (country)
Magic realism writers
Postmodern writers